The Lercheck Limestone is a geologic formation in Germany. It preserves fossils dating back to the Triassic period.

See also 

 List of fossiliferous stratigraphic units in Germany

References

External links 
 

Geologic formations of Germany
Triassic Germany
Limestone formations